The following is a list of subdivisions in the Vaishali district of Bihar in the State of India. The total area of the Vaishali district is 2,036 km2. This includes 1,998.48 km2 of rural area and 37.52 km2 of urban area. Vaishali has a population of 34,95,021 and the area is further divided into subdivisions for administrative purposes.

Subdivisions in Vaishali district
Hajipur
Bhagwanpur 
Bidupur 
Chehra Kalan 
Desri 
Goraul  
Jandaha 
Lalganj 
Mahnar 
Mahua 
Patepur 
Paterhi Belsar 
Raghopur 
Raja Pakar 
Sahdai Buzurg 
Vaishali

Vaishali
Vaishali district